Nélson Purchio (born 26 June 1941) is a Brazilian former footballer.

References

1941 births
Living people
Association football defenders
Brazilian footballers
Fluminense FC players
Pan American Games medalists in football
Pan American Games silver medalists for Brazil
Footballers at the 1959 Pan American Games
Medalists at the 1959 Pan American Games